The Four Inns is a fell race/hiking event held annually over the high moorlands of the Northern Peak District. It takes place mainly in Derbyshire (though it starts in Yorkshire and, near the end, makes a short detour into Cheshire), in northern England. It is organised by the Scout Association. It is a competitive event, without an overnight camp (although teams must be equipped to bivouac if the conditions are severe enough to warrant it). It was first held as a Rover Scout event in 1957, but is now open to other teams of experienced hill walkers and fell runners.

Rules
The event is undertaken in teams of three or four, for safety reasons, and at least two of these team members must be at least 17 (the others may be 16) on the day of the event. An amount of equipment must be carried by the team, including survival bags, emergency rations, a first-aid kit, and a group shelter. Any member of a team is allowed to drop out at any point, but the rest of the team will not be permitted to continue the event unless they are in a group of not less than 3, or more than 7 people (which can be formed by combining two groups together). The remaining team members must still carry all of the safety equipment.  Any team that has not reached the checkpoint at Chapel-en-le-Frith before 21:15 will not be allowed to complete the rest of the event.  No dogs are allowed to accompany the walkers.

Route
The 40-mile (65 km) hike starts at the local church of Holmbridge.  The first of the 12 checkpoints is the "site of" The Isle of Skye Inn, then the route heads south, crossing the flanks of Black Hill. Next, it passes through Hey Moss, Crowden, Tor Side, Bleaklow, and Doctor's Gate to the 'Snake (Pass) Inn'. The next checkpoint is over the Kinder plateau to the 'Nag's Head' Inn in Edale.  The route then passes through Chapel-en-le-Frith, White Hall, and the Goyt Valley to the 'Cat and Fiddle' Inn, finally descending to Buxton for the finish.
Usually, two thirds of the teams finish the event, in times between 8 and 16 hours (the course record of 6 hours 38 minutes was set in 2013).  However, some teams take longer than this, and some have taken over 20 hours. At most of the checkpoints, hot drinks and sandwiches will be given to the competitors, and several Mountain Rescue teams are on hand to ensure their safety.

Awards
A number of trophies are available for teams that complete the event. These are:

The 1964 Event
Three Rover Scouts, aged 19, 21, and 24 died in the 1964 event. The youngest was a member of the 32nd Huddersfield (Dalton) Rover Crew. The two older were from the Birmingham University Rover Crew. Travelling lightly laden and without support, they were overtaken by deteriorating weather, including 30 mph winds, heavy rain, and temperatures from 0 to 7 °C above the Snake Pass. The youngest of the group got into trouble in the upper reaches of the Alport Valley. One of his team members summoned help and he was brought down to Alport Castles Farm by the Glossop Rover Crew. He was taken to hospital but died later. The other two scouts who died were in a separate team, but in the same area. A third member of that team was found in the Alport and taken to safety, but he was unable to give accurate information about where the rest of the team were. Because of the worsening weather, the search had to be called off during the night, but it was resumed on Sunday morning. However, it was not until Monday afternoon that the first body was recovered. By Tuesday, 370 people were involved with the search and the second body was recovered later that morning. (In that year, when the event fell in mid-March, only 22 of the initial field of over 240 finished).

There is a Memorial Tablet to the three Scouts in Holy Trinity Church, Edale, dedicated in a memorial service held on Sunday, 22 May 1966. There is also a small memorial cairn in the Alport valley, this is at location approx. 53.427840, -1.808535. Presumably this is near to where the two scouts were found.

An MRC (Medical Research Council) respiration and metabolism project, devised to identify the metabolic and biochemical basis for this tragedy, was performed during the 1965 event, with young volunteers.

See also
 Scouting
 Ten Tors
 Three Towers Hike
 Abbots Way Walk
 Fellsman

References

External links
 Four Inns Walk official website
 Complete event results since 1957
 Derbyshire Scouts homepage

Scouting events
The Scout Association
Challenge walks